Oscar Bennie Roan III (born October 17, 1951 in Dallas, Texas) is a former American football tight end in the National Football League. He was drafted by the Cleveland Browns in the third round of the 1975 NFL Draft. He played college football at SMU and UCLA.

1951 births
Living people
Players of American football from Dallas
American football tight ends
SMU Mustangs football players
UCLA Bruins football players
Cleveland Browns players